Dil Tera Ho Gaya (English: Heart Is Now Yours) is a 2020 Pakistani film directed by Aehsun Talish, written by Saima Akram Chudhery and produced by Abdullah Kadwani under the 7th Sky Entertainment banner. The film stars Feroze Khan and Zara Noor Abbas. It was released in July 2020 as part of Geo Entertainment's Eid programming.

Cast 
Feroze Khan as Anas Ahmad; Ahmad & Fehmida's son; Roma's Cousin & Husband; Arshad & Zubaida's Nephew & Son-in-law
Zara Noor Abbas as Roma Arshad; Arshad & Zubaida's daughter; Anas's Cousin & Wife; Ahmad & Fehmida's  Niece & Daughter-in-law
Saba Faisal as Fehmi/Fehmida; Ahmad's Wife & Anas's mother; Arshad & Zubaida's Sister-in-law, Roma's Aunt & Mother-in-law
Jawed Sheikh as Ahmad; Fehmida's husband & Anas's father; Arshad's elder brother & Zubaida's brother-in-law; Roma's Uncle & father-in-law
Shaheen Khan as Zoobi/Zubaida; Arshad's wife & Roma's mother; Ahmad & Fehmida's Sister-in-law, Anas's Aunt & Mother-in-law
Farhan Ali Agha as Roma's father; Zubaida's husband & Roma's father; Arshad's younger brother & Fehmida's brother-in-law; Anas's Uncle & father-in-law
Mizna Waqas as Chanda; Maid

Digital media 
The telefilm was released digitally on channel's official YouTube channel. It was also made available on Amazone prime video after its release on television.

References 

7th Sky Entertainment
Pakistani television films